Nea Filadelfeia, known before 1927 as Naresh, is a village and a community of the Oraiokastro municipality. Before the 2011 local government reform it was part of the municipality of Kallithea, of which it was a municipal district. The 2011 census recorded 923 inhabitants in the village. The community of Nea Filadelfeia covers an area of 12.624 km2.

Transport
The Village is served by a station on Thessaloniki–Alexandroupoli line.

See also
 List of settlements in the Thessaloniki regional unit

References

Populated places in Thessaloniki (regional unit)